Aurora Jiménez Villalobos (born September 14, 2002) is a Mexican beauty pageant titleholder who was crowned as Miss Teen Mexico International 2021 and Miss Teen International 2021 in Guayaquil, Ecuador.

Pageantry

Miss Teen Earth Mexico 2021
She participated in the contest Miss Teen Earth Mexico 2021 where she won the Miss Teen Mexico International title.

Miss Teen International 2021

See also
Rodrigo Moreira

References

External links

2002 births
Living people
Mexican beauty pageant winners
Mexican female models
People from Ocotlán, Jalisco